Endu Ninnavane (Kannada: ಎಂದೂ ನಿನ್ನವನೆ) is a 1966 Indian Kannada film, directed and produced by Kalyan Kumar. The film stars Kalyan Kumar, Jayanthi, G. V. Lathadevi and Ramesh in the lead roles. The film has musical score by Rajan–Nagendra.

Cast
Kalyan Kumar
Jayanthi
G. V. Lathadevi
Ramesh

References

External links
 

1966 films
1960s Kannada-language films
Films scored by Rajan–Nagendra